Hanyang University at Ansan station is a station on Seoul Subway Line 4 & the Suin-Bundang Line in Ansan-si, Gyeonggi-do, South Korea. It is named after the city's ERICA campus of Hanyang University. Unlike the name of the station, Hanyang University is not right in front of the station. Hanyang University shuttle buses stop in front of the station. Buses usually take students from the station to the university every 10 minutes on weekdays and every 30 minutes on weekends. It takes about 10 minutes from the station to the ERICA campus.

This station was the planned southeastern terminus of the section of the Suin Line; it became a transfer point between Line 4 and the Suin Line when construction on the Suin Line was completed in 2019. Opening was delayed until autumn 2020, when it became part of the Suin–Bundang Line.

Station layout

Name 
At the time of its opening, the station was named "Handaeap", which was later changed to "Hanyang Univ. at Ansan" in 2001.

References

External links

Seoul Metropolitan Subway stations
Metro stations in Ansan
Railway stations opened in 1937

Station information 
There is Ansan Agricultural and Marine Products Wholesale Market near Exit 1. A small commercial district is formed at Exit 2, where you can take the shuttle bus to Hanyang University's ERICA Campus.